The Oglethorpe County School District is a public school district in Oglethorpe County, Georgia, United States, based in Lexington. It serves the communities of Arnoldsville, Crawford, Lexington, and Maxeys.

Schools
The Oglethorpe County School District has two elementary schools, one middle school, and one high school.

Elementary schools 
Oglethorpe County Elementary School
Oglethorpe County Primary School

Middle school
Oglethorpe County Middle School

High school
Oglethorpe County High School

References

External links

School districts in Georgia (U.S. state)
Education in Oglethorpe County, Georgia